Khlibnyi Dar (literally "Bread Gift"), also transliterated as Hlibny Dar, Hlebnyi Dar or Hlebny Dar, is a brand of horilka (Ukrainian vodka), first introduced to the market in 2002. It is owned by the Bayadera Group, produced in a factory of the National Horilka Company in the village of Stepanky in the Cherkasy Oblast of Ukraine. All products from the Khlibnyi Dar range are made through the distillation of fermented cereal grains, which is the most popular ingredient to produce vodka from in Polish and Ukrainian tradition. According to The Millionaires’ Club report, Khlibnyi Dar was the third-best-selling brand of vodka in the world in 2011.

Variants 
The original recipe from the Khlibnyi Dar brand comes in 1.75, 1, 0.7, 0.5, 0.37, 0.2 and 0.1 litre bottles, though this varies with each flavour. All types of this horilka are pure vodka made from cereal grains, but some come with small additions or differences in production that change the taste slightly. In total, there are six varieties of this distilled beverage:
 Хлібний Дар (Класична) - Khlibnyi Dar (Classic); the original and most popular type, made from wheat, rye and barley
 Хлібний Дар (Пшенична) - Khlibnyi Dar (Wheat); made from wheat and artesian water
 Хлібний Дар (на пророщеному зерні) - Khlibnyi Dar (on sprouted grain); uses extracts of germinated seeds
 Хлібний Дар (Житня Люкс) - Khlibnyi Dar (Rye Luxury); made from rye crackers, cinnamon and cumin
 Хлібний Дар (Озима) - Khlibnyi Dar (Winter); uses winter wheat grain
 Хлібний Дар (Українська) - Khlibnyi Dar (Ukrainian); made from an infusion of wheat crackers

See also

 List of vodkas

References 

Ukrainian distilled drinks
Ukrainian vodkas
Ukrainian brands
Horilkas
Alcohol in Ukraine